Grossoseta pacifica is a species of flat-footed flies (insects in the family Platypezidae).

References

Platypezidae
Articles created by Qbugbot
Insects described in 1948
Taxa named by Edward L. Kessel